Golly may refer to:

Fictional characters 
 Golliwogg, a black character in 19th-century children's books
 Golly, a cartoon character in the 2006 live action/animated film Re-Animated
 Golly Mackenzie, a fictional character in the 2000–2005 British TV series Monarch of the Glen
 Ole Golly, a fictional supporting character in the children's book Harriet the Spy and 2021 animated show.

Other 
 Golly (program), open-source software for simulating cellular automata
 Golly, Wrexham, a location in Wales
 Golly! Ghost!, a video game
 Golly Bar, an ice cream snack
 Golly Pond, a body of water in Heaton Park, Greater Manchester, England
 Richard Goleszowski, an English animator

See also
Betcha by Golly, Wow
Good Golly Miss Molly